Innichen station (Italian: stazione di San Candido) is a railway station located in Innichen (San Candido), Italy where the Puster Valley Railway and the Drava Valley Railway meet in eastern South Tyrol. It is the border station between Italy and Austria.

Location 
The station is located to the east of the Toblach saddle in the Hochpustertal (High Puster Valley) at an altitude of 1176 m. It is located on the western outskirts of Innichen adjacent to national highway 49. It is about 7 km west of the border with Austria.

History
The station was opened in 1871 together with the Puster Valley Railway and the Drava Valley Railway, which were operated by the Southern Railway Company (Südbahngesellschaft). In the 1920s, 1960s and 1980s, Ferrovie dello Stato built additional buildings, including a residential building designed by Angiolo Mazzoni.
 
Since the station is some distance from the centre of the town, it is proposed to relocate it to the east, closer to the centre of the town. A master plan for the project was commissioned by Südtiroler Transportstrukturen (South Tyrol transport facilities) and presented in 2013.

Buildings
The station building, designed by Wilhelm von Flattich, has a central structure built in conglomerate and has granite bossage. The two-story main wing is complemented by two single-story extensions. The gables are made of wood. There is a spacious warehouse on the east side and a hexagonal water supply facility on the west side.
 
The buildings have been heritage-listed since 2004.

Role
In operational terms, the Innichen station was originally designed as a minor station. However, due to the electrification of the Drava and Puster Valley Railways with different electrical systems in the 1980s, it actually became a double terminus. For years, the system change point between the Italian and Austrian networks could only be passed without changing locomotives by specially acquired ÖBB class 1822 corridor trains. Only the acquisition of Stadler Flirt multi-system multiple units by the state of South Tyrol in 2013, allowed continuous regional services between South Tyrol and East Tyrol to be re-established.
 
Innichen station is served by services operated by Trenitalia and SAD Nahverkehr (Südtiroler Automobildienst, "South Tyrol automotive service local transport"), which also operates bus services to the station.

References

Footnotes

Sources
 

Railway stations opened in 1871
1871  establishments in Austria-Hungary
Railway stations in South Tyrol